Glasgow Provan is a constituency of the Scottish Parliament (Holyrood), being one of eight constituencies within the Glasgow City council area. It elects one Member of the Scottish Parliament (MSP) by the plurality (first past the post) method of election. It is also one of nine constituencies in the Glasgow electoral region, which elects seven additional members, in addition to the nine constituency MSPs, to produce a form of proportional representation for the region as a whole.

The constituency was created in 2011, comprising much of the old Glasgow Baillieston seat which was abolished for the 2011 Scottish Parliament election.

The seat has been held by Ivan McKee of the Scottish National Party since the 2016 Scottish Parliament election.

Electoral region 

The other eight constituencies of the Glasgow region are Glasgow Anniesland, Glasgow Cathcart, Glasgow Kelvin, Glasgow Maryhill and Springburn, Glasgow Pollok, Glasgow Shettleston, Glasgow Southside and Rutherglen.

The region covers the Glasgow City council area and a north-western portion of the South Lanarkshire council area.

Constituency boundaries 

The electoral wards used in the creation of Provan are:
In full: East Centre, North East 
In part: Baillieston (shared with Glasgow Shettleston)

Member of the Scottish Parliament

Election results

2020s

2010s

See also
 Politics of Glasgow

Notes

External links

Politics of Glasgow
Scottish Parliament constituencies and regions from 2011
Constituencies of the Scottish Parliament
2011 establishments in Scotland
Constituencies established in 2011